Awaya (written: 粟屋 or 淡谷) is a Japanese surname. Notable people with the surname include:

, Japanese singer
, Japanese government official

See also
Awaya Station, a railway station in Miyoshi, Hiroshima Prefecture, Japan

Japanese-language surnames